Boogie woogie musicians are those artists who are primarily recognized as writing, performing, and recording boogie woogie music.

A
Rob Agerbeek (born 1937), Indonesian-born Dutch boogie-woogie and early jazz pianist
Dave Alexander (1938-2012), aka 'Omar Sharriff", American blues pianist
Albert Ammons (1907–1949), American pianist, father of bebop tenorman Gene Ammons
The Andrews Sisters, American singers known for "Beat Me Daddy, Eight to the Bar" and "Boogie Woogie Bugle Boy"
Winifred Atwell (1914–1983), British pianist, from Trinidad

B
Bob Baldori (born 1943), aka "Boogie Bob", American rock, blues, and boogie-woogie musician
Marcia Ball (born 1949), American singer and pianist
Deanna Bogart (born 1960), American singer, pianist, and saxophonist
Boogie Woogie Red (1925–1992), American pianist, frequent collaborator with John Lee Hooker
James Booker (1939–1983), American pianist
Eden Brent (born 1965), American pianist and vocalist

C
James Crutchfield (1912–2001), "King of Barrelhouse Blues"

D
Caroline Dahl, pianist and composer of boogie-woogie and American roots music
Cow Cow Davenport (1894–1955), American pianist
Blind John Davis (1913–1985), American pianist and singer
Daryl Davis (born 1958), American pianist, singer and bandleader
Neville Dickie (born 1937), English pianist
Fats Domino (1928–2017), American R&B pianist and singer who recorded some boogie pieces in the 1950s
Floyd Domino, American pianist; played for seven years with Asleep at the Wheel
Dorothy Donegan (1922–1998), American pianist
Thomas A. Dorsey (1899–1993), American pianist and gospel songwriter
Champion Jack Dupree (1908–1992), New Orleans blues player
Big Joe Duskin (1921–2007), American pianist

E
William Ezell (1892–1963), Texas-born pianist who combined boogie-woogie with ragtime and blues

F
Ernie Freeman (1922–1981), American pianist, organist, and arranger

G
Blind Leroy Garnett (1897–1933)
Harry Gibson, "The Hipster" (1915–1991)
Henry Gray (1925–2020), American pianist credited with helping to create the Chicago blues piano sound

H
Bob Hall (born 1942), English pianist
Willie Hall, known as Drive'em Down, model and mentor to many New Orleans players
Jools Holland (born 1958), British musician and television presenter
Camille Howard (1914–1993), American pianist and singer

J
Dr. John (1941–2019), New Orleans blues and boogie woogie pianist and composer of "Boxcar Boogie" among others
Pete Johnson (1904–1967), Big Joe Turner's piano partner; "Roll 'Em Pete" was named for him
Louis Jordan (1908–1975), American boogie and jump blues musician, songwriter and bandleader

K
Michael Kaeshammer (born 1977), Canadian pianist, vocalist, and arranger
Shizuko Kasagi (1914–1985), Japanese singer known in Japan as the }]}
Brendan Kavanagh (born 1967), contemporary British pianist teacher with over 1 million YouTube followers, known as "Dr K"

L
Ladyva (Vanessa Sabrina Gnaegi) (born 1988), Swiss pianist
Booker T. Laury (1914–1995), American pianist and singer
Meade Lux Lewis (1905–1964), American pianist whose "Honky Tonk Train Blues" was an early boogie woogie hit
Liberace (1919–1987), American pianist
Little Willie Littlefield (1931–2013), American pianist and singer
Cripple Clarence Lofton (1887–1957)
Professor Longhair (Henry "Roy" Byrd, 1918–1980), American singer; blues, rhythm and blues, and jazz pianist

M
Barrelhouse Buck McFarland (1903–1962)
Memphis Slim (1915–1988)
Big Maceo Merriweather (1905–1953), composer of "Chicago Breakdown"
Arthur Migliazza (born 1980), American blues and boogie woogie pianist.
Moon Mullican (1909–1967), known as the "King of the Hillbilly Piano Players" during a recording career that stretched from the 1930s through the 1960s, including hits such as "Seven Nights to Rock"; considered a major influence on Jerry Lee Lewis

N
Romeo Nelson (1902–1974)
Charlie Norman (1920–2005), Swedish piano player

P
Oscar Peterson (1925–2007), Canadian jazz pianist and composer
Piano Red (1911–1985), brother of Speckled Red
Piano "C" Red (1933–2013), Chicago blues and boogie-woogie pianist, singer and composer
Pinetop Perkins (1913–2011), American musician and teacher of Ike Turner
Preacher Jack (born 1942), stage name of John Lincoln Coughlin, American pianist, recording artist on Rounder Records
Sammy Price (1908–1992), American pianist and bandleader

R
Maurice Rocco (1915–1976), American pianist, singer, and actor
Walter Roland (1903–1972), American pianist, guitarist, and singer

S
Ulf Sandström (born 1964), Swedish pianist and member of jump4joy
Bob Seeley (born 1928), American pianist
Luca Sestak (born 1995), German boogie-woogie, blues and jazz pianist
Robert Shaw (1908–1985), American barrelhouse pianist, recorded "The Ma Grinder"
Freddie Slack (1910–1965), American pianist and bandleader, originator of "Beat Me Daddy, Eight To The Bar" in the 1940s
Huey "Piano" Smith (born 1934), "Rockin' Pneumonia and the Boogie Woogie Flu", also accompanist on Frankie Ford's "Sea Cruise"
Pinetop Smith (1904–1929), "Pine Top's Boogie Woogie" in 1929 was the first boogie-woogie hit and popularized the name for the style
Charlie Spand (1893–after 1958)
Speckled Red (1892–1973), American pianist and singer, recorded "The Dirty Dozens"
Roosevelt Sykes (1906–1983), The Honeydripper - 44 Blues,  Driving Wheel and  Night Time Is the Right Time,

T
Montana Taylor (1903–1958), American pianist
George Washington Thomas (1883–1937), American pianist and songwriter
Hersal Thomas (c.1909–1926), American pianist and composer
Stephanie Trick, contemporary American pianist
Big Joe Turner (1911–1985), American boogie-woogie singer, partnered with Pete Johnson

W
Tuts Washington (1907–1984), mentor to many generations of New Orleans pianists
Ben Waters (1974–), an English pianist best known for his Boogie-woogie style of playing. Member of The ABC & D of Boogie Woogie, the letters standing for the first names of the musicians: Axel Zwingenberger (piano), Ben Waters (piano), Charlie Watts (drums) and Dave Green (bass).
https://de.wikipedia.org/wiki/The_ABC%26D_of_Boogie_Woogie
Kenny "Blues Boss" Wayne (born 1944), American-born boogie-woogie/blues/R&B pianist
Vince Weber (1953–2020), German boogie/blues musician
Robert Wells, Swedish pianist, singer, and composer
Jabo Williams, American pianist and songwriter
Mitch Woods (born 1951), American modern day boogie-woogie, jazz and jump blues pianist

Y
Jimmy Yancey (1898–1951), American pianist, composer, and lyricist

Z
Silvan Zingg (born 1973), Swiss pianist
Axel Zwingenberger (born 1955), German pianist and composer

References

Bibliography
The Story of Boogie-Woogie - A Left Hand Like God, Silvester, Peter J., The Scarecrow Press, 2009, Maryland (USA), 2nd edition, 

Boogie woogie